Mick Lowry (born 8 October 1960) is an Irish former Gaelic footballer whose league and championship career at senior level with the Offaly county team spanned eleven seasons from 1980 to 1991.

Lowry made his senior debut for Offaly during the 1980-81 league. Over the course of the next eleven seasons he won one All-Ireland in 1982. Lowry also won two Leinster medals. He played his last game for Offaly in July 1991.

Lowry's brothers, Seán and Brendan, also won All-Ireland medals with Offaly in 1982. His nephew, Shane, is a professional golfer.

Honours
Ferbane
Offaly Senior Football Championship (7): 1986, 1987, 1988, 1989, 1990, 1992, 1994):

Offaly
All-Ireland Senior Football Championship (1): 1982
Leinster Senior Football Championship (2): 1981, 1982

References

1960 births
Living people
ESB people
Ferbane Gaelic footballers
Mick
Offaly inter-county Gaelic footballers
Winners of one All-Ireland medal (Gaelic football)